The Polokwane Local Municipality is a Local Municipality in Limpopo, South Africa. The council consists of ninety members elected by mixed-member proportional representation. Forty-five councillors are elected by first-past-the-post voting in forty-five wards, while the remaining forty-five are chosen from party lists so that the total number of party representatives is proportional to the number of votes received. In the election of 1 November 2021 the African National Congress (ANC) won a majority of fifty-six seats.

Results 
The following table shows the composition of the council after past elections.

December 2000 election

The following table shows the results of the 2000 election.

March 2006 election

The following table shows the results of the 2006 election.

May 2011 election

The following table shows the results of the 2011 election.

August 2016 election

The following table shows the results of the 2016 election.

November 2021 election

The following table shows the results of the 2021 election.

By-elections from November 2021
The following by-elections were held to fill vacant ward seats in the period since the election in November 2021.

In the ward 10 by-election held on 25 January 2023 after the death of the previous Economic Freedom Fighters (EFF) councillor, the EFF candidate retained the seat for the party. ActionSA contested its first by-election in Limpopo, winning 10% of the vote.

References

Polokwane
Elections in Limpopo
Polokwane